Not Without Love is the second studio album from CCM musician Jimmy Needham. It was released on August 19, 2008 through Inpop Records in the United States. The album's lead single "A Breath or Two" was released prior to the album, and reached No. 11 on Christian contemporary hit radio.

Musical style 
Similar to his last album, Speak, Jimmy Needham has frequently been compared to Jason Mraz in musical style, as well as John Mayer and Marc Broussard. Not Without Love'''s main genre is alternative CCM, although Needham takes influence from other styles such as rock and blues with a "jazzy pop" sound.

 Lyrics 
The lyrical songwriting in Not Without Love has often been noted as having "clever wordplay" similar to pop/jazz musician Jason Mraz. Needham was newly married when writing the album, and two songs were written about his wife Kelly Needham. "Firefly" is a lighthearted, "ragtime style" song about marriage, while "Unfailing Love (Kelly's Song)" is a ballad that Needham sang at his wedding, originally written as a proposal to Kelly.

 Promotion and release 

In promotion of the album, Not Without Love's first single, "A Breath or Two", was released to radios in mid-2008. The album was subsequently released on August 19, 2008 in the U.S. under the Inpop label. It debuted at number 8 on both the Christian AC Soundscan and Overall Christian Digital charts. Later in the year, Needham guested on Christian rock band BarlowGirl's Million Voices Tour along with Brooke Barrettsmith; the tour began on September 12 in Houston, Texas, and ran until mid-November 2008. "A Breath or Two" also garnered success, reaching #13 on R&R's Christian CHR radio chart by the week of September 4, and reached a peak of at least #11 through early 2009. The album's second single, "Forgiven and Loved", was released early in the year near the same time.

 Reception Not Without Love'' received generally positive reviews from critics. AllMusic reviewer Jared Johnson noted that Jimmy Needham "stepped up his game" with his second release, having better production quality than his debut album; Johnson claimed that "Christian music lovers need a lot more like this".

Track listing

References 

2008 albums
Jimmy Needham albums
Inpop Records albums